Thomas McElwee (30 November 1957 – 8 August 1981) was an Irish republican who participated in the 1981 hunger strike and a volunteer in the Provisional Irish Republican Army (IRA). From Bellaghy, County Londonderry, Northern Ireland, he died at the age of 23 after 62 days on hunger strike.

Paramilitary activity
Thomas McElwee and his cousin Francis Hughes formed an independent Republican unit, which for several years carried out ambushes on British Army patrols as well carrying out bomb attacks in neighbouring towns such as Magherafelt, Castledawson, and Maghera.

In October 1976, McElwee took part in a planned bombing blitz on the town of Ballymena. Along with several colleagues, he was transporting one of the bombs, which exploded prematurely and blinded him in his right eye. Following his arrest, he was charged and sentenced to 20 years' imprisonment for possession of explosives and the murder of Yvonne Dunlop, who was killed when one of the firebombs destroyed the shop she was working in. His murder charge was reduced to manslaughter on appeal, although the original jail term stood.

In prison he became involved in the blanket protest. He joined the 1981 Irish hunger strike and died on 8 August 1981 at the age of 23, after 62 days on the strike.

Aftermath

In 2009, Republican Sinn Féin named their Waterford cumann after him replacing that of George Lennon, O/C of the Waterford Flying Column who led the IRA anti-Treaty Republicans into Waterford City in March 1922. The Waterford RSF had adopted the Lennon name without the permission of his son who noted that his father had, in later years, become a committed pacifist and opponent of the war in Vietnam. McElwee is the main subject of the song Farewell to Bellaghy, which also mentions his cousin Francis Hughes, other members of the independent Republican unit and deceased volunteers of the South Derry Brigade of the Provisional IRA. He is also the subject of the Crucifucks' song The Story of Thomas McElwee.

References

1957 births
1981 deaths
Irish republicans
Irish people convicted of manslaughter
People from County Londonderry
People who died on the 1981 Irish hunger strike
Provisional Irish Republican Army members
Bombers (people)